Ionel Cazan (born 25 November 1988 in Bucharest) is a Romanian rugby union player. He plays as a centre.

Cazan played for Steaua București and currently plays for Farul Constanța, in the Romanian Rugby Championship.

He has 15 caps for Romania, since his first game in 2010, with 2 tries scored, 10 points on aggregate. He was called for the 2011 Rugby World Cup, playing in three games, one as a substitute, and scoring a try. He hasn't been called again since 2013.

References

External links

1988 births
Living people
CSA Steaua București (rugby union) players
Romanian rugby union players
Rugby union centres
Rugby union players from Bucharest
Romania international rugby union players